Richard, Duke of Gloucester may refer to:

Prince Richard, Duke of Gloucester (born 1944)
Richard III of England (1483–1485), Duke of Gloucester prior to his accession to the throne